This article is a list of  national symbols of the Confederate States enacted through legislation. Upon its independence (adoption of the Constitution for the Provisional Government of the Confederate States) on February 8, 1861, and subsequent foundation of the permanent government on February 22, 1862, the Confederate States Congress adopted national symbols distinct from those of the United States.

See also

 Washington Monument (Richmond, Virginia)

References

Further reading

 
 
 

 
Confederate States of America-related lists
Confederate States national